Tori & Dean: sTORIbook Weddings is an American reality television series on Oxygen. The series premiered on April 6, 2011. The show follows celebrities turned wedding planners Tori Spelling and Dean McDermott as they turn one lucky couple's wedding from ordinary to an extraordinary Hollywood affair each week.

The series is a spin-off of Tori & Dean: Home Sweet Hollywood.

Episodes

References

External links 

2010s American reality television series
2011 American television series debuts
2011 American television series endings
Oxygen (TV channel) original programming
Wedding television shows